Old Trees is a historic home and national historic district located at Cazenovia in Madison County, New York. The district contains four contributing buildings. The main house was built in 1917 as a large, two story, rustic lodge.  It was remodeled in 1937 in the Georgian Revival style by the prominent Buffalo firm of Bley and Lyman.  Also on the property is a carriage house, guest cottage, and equipment barn; all were built about 1917.

It was added to the National Register of Historic Places in 1991.

References

Houses on the National Register of Historic Places in New York (state)
Historic districts on the National Register of Historic Places in New York (state)
Colonial Revival architecture in New York (state)
Houses completed in 1917
Houses in Madison County, New York
National Register of Historic Places in Cazenovia, New York